Baranca may refer to several villages in Romania:

 Baranca, a village in Cristinești Commune, Botoşani County
 Baranca, a village in Hudeşti Commune, Botoşani County

See also
 Baranca River (disambiguation)
 Barranca (disambiguation)
 Baranga (disambiguation)